Fine on the Outside is a single by American recording artist and musician Priscilla Ahn. It features the title song, "Fine on the Outside", the theme song of the 2014 Studio Ghibli film When Marnie Was There, as well as "This Old House", the theme song of the When Marnie Was There x Yohei Taneda Exhibition that was held at the Edo-Tokyo Museum from 27 July 2014 to 15 September 2014.

Background
Priscilla Ahn, in common with the protagonist, saw herself as friendless and alone, and turned to music and other interests as a way to compensate. "...would literally sit on my bed and look out the window at night at the moon, and wonder if I was loved... if anyone would miss me if I was gone."  This led her to writing "Fine on the Outside" in 2005, but she had never released it due to the lyrics being too personal, and because she didn't want to have to change the song in any way to make it fit in with her other albums. A big fan of Ghibli, she read the original novel When Marnie Was There after the announcement they were working on a movie adaptation, saw herself in Anna, and eventually decided to submit the song to Ghibli. The movie's producer Yoshiaki Nishimura contacted her soon afterwards saying how much he loved the song, and it was later officially chosen as the theme song.

Personnel
Priscilla Ahn - vocals, guitar

Release
It was released in Japan as a CD single and a digital single on 2 July 2014.

Track listing
"Fine on the Outside"  – 4:12
"This Old House" – 3:19
"Fine on the Outside (Original Karaoke)"  – 4:12

References

Songs written for animated films
2014 songs